Ivan Vidav (January 17, 1918 – October 6, 2015) was a Slovenian mathematician.

Ivan Vidav was born in Villa Opicina near Trieste, Italy. He was a student of Josip Plemelj. Vidav received his Ph.D. with Plemelj as his advisor in 1941 at the University of Ljubljana with the dissertation Kleinovi teoremi v teoriji linearnih diferencialnih enačb (Klein's Theorems in the Theory of Linear Differential Equations).

Vidav's main research interest were differential equations, functional analysis, and algebra. He was a regular member of the Slovenian Academy of Sciences and Arts. He received the Prešeren Award in recognition of his work.

In 1988, he became an honorary member of the Society of Mathematicians, Physicists and Astronomers of Slovenia (DMFA).

References

1918 births
2015 deaths
20th-century Slovenian mathematicians
Yugoslav mathematicians
Scientists from Trieste
Prešeren Award laureates
University of Ljubljana alumni
Members of the Slovenian Academy of Sciences and Arts